Swinton Square, formerly known as Swinton Shopping Centre, is a shopping centre located between Chorley Road (A6) and Swinton Hall Road in Swinton, near Manchester, England.

The centre was built in 1966. Swinton Square houses a diverse number of shops, with many specialising in a certain area of life. It also held a small open air market until fairly recently. The complex includes the 1970s Swinton Library and the Lancastrian Hall As part of the recent redevelopment of the shopping area, a new Asda superstore opened in 2014. There is also a Morrisons superstore nearby on Swinton Hall Road, which was originally built in 1992 as a Safeway UK store, until Morrisons acquired the Safeway chain in 2004. The store was eventually rebranded to Morrisons in November 2005.

Facilities  
Swinton Shopping Centre decided to introduce pay and display parking in 2005 until 2010 for the use of the three car packs that are on the site. They are open to members of the public 24 hours a day and seven days a week, including public holidays. In 2010 the control of the car parks returned to GVA Grimley and they returned the site to free parking.

When the centre introduced the pay and display system around 4,000 people demanded that they remove the pay and display system. Traders at Swinton Shopping Centre said that business had fallen by up to a third since the introduction of pay-and-display in 2005. 
As of August 2010 the original owner of the site, GVA Grimley, has regained control of the land and parking meters were removed from the centre.

The precinct is mainly on ground floor level and easily accessible for disabled patrons via the main entrance on Station Road (B5231).

The centre was rebranded "Swinton Square" in 2014.

Shops
Swinton Square has many shops that focus in these areas:
Fashion
Financial services (banks etc.)
Food and drink
Hair and beauty
Health
Household goods
Jewellery
Leisure
Music, books, cards and gifts
Sports
Travel.

Market
Swinton Square operated a small open air market until recent times every Tuesday, Thursday, Friday and Saturday from 9.00am until 4.30pm. It was located in one of the large spaces that the precinct has. In recent years the market has had a stand-alone roof fitted over the market stalls.

Swinton Library
Swinton Library was located next to the centre of the development and was built in 1969, opening in 1970 in a large building which also housed the Lancastrian Hall on Chorley Road at the corner of Station Road. The Lancastrian Hall had been closed a number of years before as a cost-cutting exercise. The library closed on Saturday 27 June 2015 and reopened on 20 July a short distance away in the new Swinton Gateway building next to St. Peter's Church.

Services

Adult fiction and non-fiction books
Art gallery
Bookshop
Children's book and tape packs
Children's fiction and non-fiction books
DVDs
Exhibition space
Fax
Holiday activities for children
Internet access
Language cassettes
Merchandise
Music CDs
Parents' collection
Personal book buying service
Photocopying
Public noticeboard
Reference collection
Talking books
Teenage collection
Under 5s story time
Videos

References

External links
Official website

Buildings and structures in the City of Salford
Shopping centres in Greater Manchester
Swinton, Greater Manchester